is a Japanese composer, arranger and music producer best known for his role on the soundtrack of several anime series and video games. His works include the musical scores for High School DxD, Kuroko's Basketball and The Devil is a Part-Timer!. He often goes by the alias R-midwest.

Nakanishi is the co-founder of the music agency ApDream Group, as well as the executive director of the music production company Artus. He is also a member of the Japan Composers and Arrangers Association (JCAA).

Biography 
Nakanishi was born in Tokyo, in 1976. He was born in a family of musicians, so he received music education since an early age. He began composing music for other artists in 2000. In 2004, he made his debut as a soundtrack composer with the ending theme song "Aoi Tabibito", from the anime Mars Daybreak. Since then, he has been active as a musician, having provided the music for many visual media works, mostly arranging tracks, opening themes and ending themes for anime.

Works

Anime

Video games

References

External links 
  
 Discography at VGMdb
 
 

1976 births
21st-century Japanese male musicians
21st-century Japanese composers
Anime composers
Living people
Musicians from Tokyo